Poochi may refer to:
Poochi Srinivasa Iyengar (1860–1919), singer and composer of Carnatic music
Poochi (Powerpuff Girls character)
Poochi (film), 2008 Tamil film
Poo-Chi, robot dog created by Tiger Toys
Chihuahua-poodle hybrid

See also
Poochie (disambiguation)